Leahead is an electric car sub brand by GAC Toyota, a joint venture between GAC Group and Toyota, founded in 2015.

History
The Leahead brand was first previewed in 2013 at the Shanghai Motor Show by a subcompact crossover SUV concept and was officially announced in October 2014. A concept of the first production car for the marque, the Leahead i1, was unveiled at the 2015 Shanghai Motor Show and the production-ready version was unveiled at the Guangzhou Auto Show later that year.

Products

i1

The i1 was sold for the 2015-2016 model years. 

In 2018, Leahead i1s were recalled for replacing their defective Takata airbags.

iA5
The iA5 is an electric compact sedan based on GAC New Energy's Aion S. It has a redesigned front and rear different from the Aion S. Its interior has a minor difference from the Aion S.

iX4
The iX4 is an electric compact crossover SUV based on the facelifted electric Trumpchi GS4 and was revealed at the 2018 Chengdu Motor Show. The GS4 is sold as the Toyota Leahead iX4 along with the Mitsubishi Eupheme Qizhi, Honda Everus Shirui, and Fiat Yuejie. The iX4 is a pure EV while the others are plug-in hybrid electric vehicles.

See also
 Aion
 Everus

References

Toyota brands and marques
GAC Group joint ventures
Joint ventures
Vehicle manufacturing companies established in 2015
Production electric cars